Apiletria luella is a moth of the family Autostichidae. It is found on Cyprus and in Turkey, Syria and Palestine.

References

Moths described in 1855
Apiletria
Insects of Turkey